Whit Dickey (born May 28, 1954) is an American drummer. He has recorded albums with David S. Ware and Matthew Shipp.

Biography
His first album as a leader was Transonic, in 1998. Two years later, Wobbly Rail issued his Big Top. In 2001, Dickey recorded six of his compositions with Mat Maneri, Shipp, and Rob Brown under the name Nommonsemble, resulting in the album Life Cycle.

Discography

As leader

As sideman

References

Avant-garde jazz musicians
American jazz drummers
American jazz bandleaders
Living people
1954 births
20th-century American drummers
American male drummers
20th-century American male musicians
American male jazz musicians
Clean Feed Records artists
AUM Fidelity artists
RogueArt artists